Beneath the City Streets: A Private Inquiry into the Nuclear Preoccupations of Government is a 1970 book by British author Peter Laurie. It details the existence and necessity of underground bunkers, food depots, and government safe havens throughout underground London and the UK from 1914 to 1970.

The book consists of linked articles on aspects of nuclear war and UK civil defence:
 War Comes to the British Homeland
 What the Bomb Does to People, Houses and Other Things
 Accuracy of Rockets and Nuclear Effect Against Military Targets
 Two Kinds of Nuclear War, and Their Drawbacks
 MIRV, ABM and the Arms Race. Hardware in Space and Under the Sea
 Chemical and Biological Weapons
 British Civil Defence and the H-Bomb
 Recovery from a Nuclear War
 Government Citadels in Britain
 The Impact of Latent Nuclear War on Democracy

References

External links
 https://web.archive.org/web/20090428005836/http://www.subbrit.org.uk/rsg/books.html
 Home Office reaction to book on civil defence ('Beneath the City Streets') by Peter Laurie, UK National Archives reference HO 322/777

1970 non-fiction books
Subterranean London
Civil defense